O Tempo não Pára (in English: Time Doesn't Stop) is a Brazilian rock song, created by the singer Cazuza, in collaboration with Arnaldo Brandão in 1988. It is the sixth issue that is part of their self-titled live album, O Tempo não Pára.

Words and meaning 
The lyrics cover the artist's life from his birth and dedicate one of its verses to the media of his country; that had considered him dead early in his later years, when the author was dying of AIDS. It is, in itself, a complaint about the irritation of Cazuza with a society that criticized both his lifestyle and his illness, his vices and sexual orientation, and at the same time it is proposed as a critique of the exploitation of his image in media. Along with the songs "Exagerado" and "Ideologia", "O Tempo não Para", it is considered one of his greatest hits as a solo artist.

Covers 
 In 1992, Argentina's rock band Bersuit Vergarabat, released his first studio album, Y Punto; and it included a Spanish adaptation of "O Tempo não Pára", entitled "El tiempo no para", which became a classic Argentine rock. In his honor, Gustavo Cordera sings one of the song's verses in the live version in Portuguese in 2002.
 In 2018, Brazilian singer Elza Soares recorded a cover of "O Tempo não Pára" to be included in O Tempo Não Para telenovela soundtrack.

References

External links 
 "O Tempo não Pára" (live 1988)

Brazilian songs
1988 songs
Portuguese-language songs
Songs about Brazil